The 1969 Chester Professional Tournament was an invitational non-ranking snooker tournament, which took place from 21 to 23 July 1969 at the Upton-By-Chester British Legion, Chester. Jackie Rea won the tournament by defeating John Spencer 4–3 in the final.

The tournament was part of the City of Chester Sports Fortnight, which had a programme encompassing twenty different sports. Snooker events were organised by the Chester & District League and were held at the Upton-By-Chester British Legion, with the snooker tournament featuring four professional players who competed, in a knockout format, from 21 to 23 July 1969.

In the semi-finals, Rea defeated Kingsley Kennerley 4–1, and Spencer eliminated David Taylor 4–0. Spencer was able to use his cue again in the sixth frame, but Rea won that frame as well to achieve a winning margin at 4–2. The last frame of the match went to Spencer, leaving the final score 4–3.

Results
Players in bold denote match winners.

Final
Scores in bold indicate winning  scores.  over 40 are shown in parentheses.

References

Chester Professional Tournament
Chester Professional Tournament
Chester Professional Tournament